Njangal Santhushtaranu is a 1999 Indian Malayalam-language domestic drama film directed by Rajasenan and starring Jayaram and Abhirami in lead roles.

Plot

Sanjeevan (Jayaram) is a police commissioner who lives with his widowed father and two younger sisters.  He is also a singer in the police troupe along with police constable Salperu Sadanandan (Jagathy Sreekumar), who is living with his two wives Kamakshi (Manju Pillai) and Meenakshi. One day he falls in love with Geethu (Abhirami), who is the daughter of the Director General of Police and gets married.

Geethu has been pampered since childhood and is spoiled by the love of her parents. Geethu is very proud of her DGP father and often boasts of her being the DGP's daughter.

After marriage, Geethu causes misery to Sanjeevan's sisters. On the day of Geethu's parent's wedding anniversary while Sanjeevan investigating a case, he does not reach home as he gets into a fight with a gang of thugs on the way back. Geethu plays a cruel trick by informing the police control room that Sanjeevan had died. His family is in pain, and when Sanjeevan returns home, everybody is shocked. Sanjeevan finds out that Geethu was the mastermind behind the trick and slaps her for her deed. She goes back to her home, in anger.

Geethu's family reveals to her that she is an adopted child, and their second child, a computer addict (Prajeesh Balachandran) was born after her adoption and so she should not feel proud of her legacy. Ashamed of herself, Geethu runs away to an orphanage. Her family visits her and reveals that Sanjeevan knew about her past before marriage, and was willing to marry her. Finally, Geethu returns to Sanjeevan's home and starts life afresh.

Cast
Jayaram as City Police Commissioner Sanjeevan IPS
Abhirami as Geethu Sanjeevan
Oduvil Unnikrishnan as Retd. Head Constable "Marmam" Gopala Pillai, Sanjeevan's Father
Narendra Prasad as DGP Rajasekharan Nair IPS, Geethu's Father
Jagathy Sreekumar as Head Constable "Salperu" Sadanandan
Janardhanan as DIG Idikkula Ittoop IPS
Cochin Haneefa as Kannappan, Geethu's uncle
 Seena Antony as Savitri, Sanjeevan's Sister
Manju Pillai as Kamakshi
N. F. Varghese as Gurukkal
Bindu Panicker as Soudamini, Geethu's aunt
Kaviyoor Ponnamma as Mother of the Orphanage
K. T. S. Padannayil as IG Ashokan
Bobby Kottarakkara as Govindan, Policeman
Kochu Preman as Chandran, Policeman
Jayakumar Parameswaran Pillai as Balan, Policeman
Pushkala Sivanandan as Geetu’s Mother
Sreekandan Nair as Sreekandan Nair (Show Host)

Soundtrack 
The film's soundtrack contains 8 songs, all composed by Ouseppachan, with lyrics by S. Ramesan Nair.

References

External links
 

1990s Malayalam-language films
1999 romantic comedy-drama films
1999 films
Indian romantic comedy-drama films
Films directed by Rajasenan
Films scored by Ouseppachan